Thurya is a monotypic genus of flowering plant belonging to the family Caryophyllaceae. It only contains one known species, Thurya capitata Boiss. & Balansa

It is native to Turkey.

The genus name of Thurya is in honour of Jean Marc Antoine Thury (1822–1905), a Swiss naturalist and professor of botany at the University of Geneva. The Latin specific epithet of capitata means having dense-headed growth and is derived from capitatus.
Both the genus and the species were first described and published in P.E.Boissier, Diagn. Pl. Orient., series.2, Vol.5 on pages 63-64 in 1856.

References

Caryophyllaceae
Caryophyllaceae genera
Plants described in 1856